The 2019–20 Nicholls Colonels men's basketball team represented Nicholls State University in the 2019–20 NCAA Division I men's basketball season. The Colonels, led by second-year head coach Austin Claunch, played their home games at Stopher Gymnasium in Thibodaux, Louisiana as members of the Southland Conference. They finished the season 21–10, 15–5 in Southland play to finish in a tie for second place. They were set to take on Lamar in the second round of the Southland tournament until the tournament was cancelled amid the COVID-19 pandemic.

Previous season
The Colonels finished the 2018–19 season 14–17 overall, 7–11 in Southland play to finish in 10th place. Since only the top eight teams are eligible for the Southland tournament, they failed to qualify.

Roster

Schedule and results

|-
!colspan=12 style=| Non-conference regular season

|-
!colspan=9 style=| Southland regular season

|-
!colspan=12 style=| Southland tournament
|- style="background:#bbbbbb"
| style="text-align:center"|March 12, 20207:30 pm, ESPN+
| style="text-align:center"| (3)
| vs. (6) LamarSecond round
| colspan=2 rowspan=1 style="text-align:center"|Cancelled due to the COVID-19 pandemic
| style="text-align:center"|Merrell CenterKaty, TX
|-
|-

Source

See also 
2019–20 Nicholls Colonels women's basketball team

References

Nicholls Colonels men's basketball seasons
Nicholls Colonels
Nicholls Colonels men's basketball
Nicholls Colonels men's basketball